Ewen John Chatfield  (born 3 July 1950) is a former New Zealand cricketer. A medium-pace bowler, though Chatfield played 43 Tests and 114 One Day Internationals for his country, he is also remembered for having been hit in the head by a ball while batting, causing him to collapse and need resuscitation.

With the ball, his chief weapon was his accuracy, giving him economical bowling figures, although he occasionally would come in for punishment in the late stages of limited overs matches due to a lack of variation in his line and length.

Domestic career
In a three-day match for Wellington in February 1980, Chatfield played a key role in defeating the West Indies, who were at the time the best cricket team in the world, taking six wickets in the first innings and seven in the second.

Chatfield also played for Hutt Valley in the Hawke Cup. In 1984 he was awarded the Hutt City Sportsperson of the Year award (the first person to receive this award).

International career
With the ball, Chatfield distinguished himself with efforts against the West Indies, the leading cricketing side of the day, on tour in 1984/85 and in the home series which New Zealand drew in 1986/87. He was also a member of the New Zealand sides which achieved the country's first Test series wins against England and Australia at home and away. Chatfield spent much of his career as the bowling partner to Sir Richard Hadlee. Coincidentally, the pair share the same birthday, though Chatfield is one year Hadlee's senior.

Head injury
Chatfield is also noted for being seriously injured on the cricket field, in the First Test against England in the 1974–75 season at Eden Park, Auckland. England were at the end of a long and difficult tour in which they had been defeated in the Ashes by Australia, chiefly by the Australian fast bowlers Jeff Thomson and Dennis Lillee. Chatfield, a number 11 batsman, was holding up England with a last wicket partnership with his future captain, Geoff Howarth. English fast bowler Peter Lever decided to test Chatfield with a bouncer. At the time helmets and other now common protective gear were not in use. The ball deflected from Chatfield's bat and struck him on the temple, rendering him unconscious and not breathing. The English team's physiotherapist Bernard Thomas was the first to realise what had happened: Chatfield had swallowed his tongue. Thomas flicked it back into place and managed to revive Chatfield with heart massage and mouth-to-mouth resuscitation. Lever was distraught; Chatfield later joked that when he was visited by Lever in hospital, "he looked worse than I did". A couple of years later helmets were introduced into cricket and Chatfield wore one thereafter.

Late career
A classic no.11 batsmen, In one of the most memorable tests in New Zealand cricket history, he accompanied Wellington teammate Jeremy Coney in a partnership to defeat Pakistan at Carisbrook, Dunedin, in the 1984/85 Test series. It was technically not a last wicket win, as Lance Cairns was still available to bat, but Cairns was severely concussed at the time and essentially incapable of batting, making Chatfield his side's last hope for a series win. Chatfield managed his highest Test score, an unbeaten 21. Such was Coney's faith in his partner that Chatfield ended up facing 84 deliveries during their stand as opposed to Coney's 48.

In the 1990 New Year Honours, Chatfield was appointed a Member of the Order of the British Empire, for services to cricket.

After cricket
Since retiring from first-class cricket, Chatfield has had a variety of jobs. He coached the Hutt Valley association until they merged with Wellington, worked in a chip shop, was a courier and drove a van for a dairy. He also mowed lawns, and in 2009 was working as a taxi driver in Wellington.

In 2020, the 95-year old Basin Reserve Museum Stand was reopened and the Old Pavilion Stand therein was renamed for Chatfield.

References

External links
 
 I never bowled a bouncer – interview at ESPNcricinfo

1950 births
Living people
Cricketers at the 1979 Cricket World Cup
Cricketers at the 1983 Cricket World Cup
Cricketers at the 1987 Cricket World Cup
Cricketers from Dannevirke
New Zealand cricketers
New Zealand Members of the Order of the British Empire
New Zealand One Day International cricketers
New Zealand taxi drivers
New Zealand Test cricketers
North Island cricketers
Wellington cricketers